Henry Cele (30 January 1949 – 2 November 2007) was a South African football player and actor. In the 1960s Cele became a goal keeper for the South African Soccer League and played the sport until 1978. In 1981, he was asked to audition for the role of the Zulu Warrior King Shaka kaSenzangakhona on stage for a production that played for a year. For the 1986  television miniseries Shaka Zulu, he reprised the role and gained significant fame worldwide.

Following this success, he appeared in roles in films and television. In 2001, he returned to the role of Shaka for the television movie Shaka Zulu: The Last Great Warrior 15 years after the original. In 2007, Cele died after spending two weeks in the hospital due to a chest infection.

Early life
On 20 June 1941, Cele was born in KwaMashu, Durban, South Africa. Within his family, he was referred to by his clan name Ndosi (Bavela KwaMthetwa), or Magaye.

Cele was raised by his grandmother, at the age of 16 due to financial problems he had to leave school and turned to sports.

Career

As an athlete
Cele, nicknamed "Black Cat" for his prowess as a goalkeeper, played for Aces United in the old South African Soccer League (SASL) in the 1960s. He also played for Lamontville Golden Arrows f.c soccer team in Lamontville Township and coached a professional soccer club in South Africa until his death.  On Saturdays, he played for Durity Football Club in the Commercial Football League in Durban.

In 1978, Cele felt he was he was too old to and retired from the sport, hence he started coaching and managing players.

As an actor

In November 1981, Cele was approached to audition to play the role Shaka, a Zulu chief who led an army against the British empire in 1800s, in the stage production "Shaka" which ran for a year.

In 1986, the five episodes of the ten hours miniseries Shaka Zulu premiered. Director Bill Faure who saw him in the stage production suggested that he auditioned. Cele beat out 4000 individual who also auditioned. 

In 1988, Cele acted in David Winters's Rage to Kill, and Freedom Fighters.

In 1990, Cele acted in Curse III: Blood Sacrifice. 

In 1996, Cele acted in Stephen Hopkins's The Ghost and the Darkness.

Cele appeared again in 2001 as Shaka in the 3-hour 2-part miniseries, called Shaka Zulu: The Citadel. Set in winter 1827. It was also released in a 2-hour telemovie version called Shaka Zulu: The Last Great Warrior.

Later years and death 
In later years, Cele moved from his suburban home in Glenmore, south of Durban, and returned to his hometown in KwaMashu township.

Cele died in Durban on 2 December 2007,  after two weeks in hospital due to a chest infection. It was reported by News24, that in his final weeks he became aggressive with the other patients and staff of the  St Augustine's Hospital. He is buried at the Stellawood Cemetery in Durban eThekwini Metropolitan Municipality, KwaZulu-Natal, South Africa.

Personal 
Cele was married to Jenny Hollander, and had four children from a previous wedding.

Filmography
 Bush Shrink (1988), Catambilo
 Blind Justice (1988), Kamisu
 Rage to Kill (1988), Wally Arn
 Freedom Fighters (1988), Jaunde
 The Last Samurai (1988), General Zohani
 Shaka Zulu (1986-1989), Shaka - TV mini-series, episodes 1-10
 In the Name of Blood (1989), Pheto
 The Tangent Affair (1989), B.J. Rickson
 Schweitzer (1990), Oganga
 The Rutanga Tapes (1990), Samaani
 Killer Instinct (1990), Samaani
 Curse III: Blood Sacrifice (1990), Mletch
 Point of Impact (1990), Titus
 Sweating Bullets (1990), Mosoeu
 Deal of a Lifetime (1990), Mosoeu
 Ipi Tombi (1990), Duke
 The Ghost and the Darkness (1996), Mahina
 Shaka Zulu: The Last Great Warrior (2001), Shaka Zulu

Awards
 Golden Plumes Award

References

External links
 
 King Shaka Zulu - South Africa History Online
 Memorial Tribute 

1941 births
2007 deaths
South African male television actors
South African soccer players
Association football goalkeepers
Actors from Durban
Infectious disease deaths in South Africa
Zulu people
South African male film actors